WikiBhasha is a multi-lingual content creation application for the online encyclopedia Wikipedia.

Overview
WikiBhasha enables contributors to Wikipedia to find content from Wikipedia articles, translate it into other languages, and then either compose new articles or enhance existing articles in the various language versions of Wikipedia.  The tool acts as a simple and intuitive user interface layer that stays on the target language Wikipedia article that is being created or enhanced during the user-session.  At the end of the session, all the additions or modifications of content are submitted to the target language Wikipedia in the updating process.

WikiBhasha supports content creation in more than 30 languages. It enables easy content creation in non-English Wikipedias by leveraging the large volume of English Wikipedia content as the source of information. Initially, the Wikimedia Foundation and Microsoft Research were working closely with the Wikipedia user communities focusing on content creation in Arabic, German, Hindi, Japanese, Portuguese and Spanish.  The word Bhasha means language in many North Indian languages, and is related to the word Bahasa of Malaysia and Indonesia.

The software is similar to the Google Translator Toolkit used to translate Wikipedia articles since 2008. The key difference between the two is that WikiBhasha runs as an overlay within the Wikipedia interface, while the Google toolkit runs elsewhere and requires a Google account.

Availability
As of 2010, WikiBhasha (Beta) was available as:
 MediaWiki extension, under Apache License 2.0 and partly under GPL v2,
 Installable bookmarklet (and a Greasemonkey Script for Firefox users) from the WikiBhasha  site.

User guide
The WikiBhasha beta user guide  provides instructions for installation and use.

See also

Machine translation
Microsoft Translator
Comparison of machine translation applications

References

Further reading

External links
 Home of WikiBhasha  and MediaWiki extension page
 Home of WikiBABEL Project site 
 Microsoft Research announcement on the release of WikiBhasha
 Wikimedia Foundation announcement on WikiBhasha
 WikiBhasha: Enhancing Multilingual Content in Wikipedia - Microsoft Research

Multilingualism
Translation software
Wikipedia
Microsoft free software
Microsoft Research
Software using the Apache license